A number of steam-powered ships were named Duke of Connaught, including:

See also

Ship names